Bar Aftab-e Jalaleh (also Romanized as Bar Āftāb-e Jalāleh) is a village in Sadat Mahmudi Rural District, Pataveh District, Dana County, Kohgiluyeh and Boyer-Ahmad Province, Iran. At the 2006 census, its population was 150, in 35 families.

References 

Populated places in Dana County